Kosmos 1481 ( meaning Cosmos 1481) was a Soviet US-K missile early warning satellite which was launched in 1983 as part of the Soviet military's Oko programme. The satellite was designed to identify missile launches using optical telescopes and infrared sensors.

Kosmos 1481 was launched from Site 43/3 at Plesetsk Cosmodrome in the Russian SSR. A Molniya-M carrier rocket with a 2BL upper stage was used to perform the launch, which took place at 19:21 UTC on 8 July 1983. The launch successfully placed the satellite into a molniya orbit. It subsequently received its Kosmos designation, and the international designator 1983-070A. The United States Space Command assigned it the Satellite Catalog Number 14182.

This satellite did not reach its working orbit and self-destructed. As well as its main entry this satellite has catalogued debris such as:

See also

 1983 in spaceflight
 List of Kosmos satellites (1251–1500)
 List of Oko satellites
 List of R-7 launches (1980–1984)

References

Kosmos satellites
Oko
1983 in spaceflight
Spacecraft launched in 1983
Spacecraft launched by Molniya-M rockets
Spacecraft that broke apart in space